Nalini Jaywant (18 February 1926 – 22 December 2010) was an Indian actress who appeared in Hindi films in the 1940s and 1950s. Filmfare in their poll in the 1950s declared her the most beautiful woman in the movies. Actor Dilip Kumar described her "the greatest actress he ever worked with".

Background and personal life 
Jaywant was born in Bombay (now Mumbai) in 1926. She was first cousin of actress Shobhna Samarth, the mother of actresses Nutan and Tanuja. Since 1983, she had been living mostly a reclusive life.

Jaywant was married to director Virendra Desai in the 1940s. Later, she married her second husband, actor Prabhu Dayal, with whom she acted in several movies.

Career 
In her teens, Jaywant appeared in Mehboob Khan's Bahen (1941), a film about a brother's obsessive love for his sister. She performed in a few more movies before filming Anokha Pyar (1948). In 1950, she garnered fame when she became a top star with her performances opposite Ashok Kumar in Samadhi and Sangram. Samadhi was a patriotic drama concerning Subhas Chandra Bose and the Indian National Army. Although the leading movie magazine of the day, Filmindia, called it "politically obsolete", it enjoyed success at the box office. Sangram was a crime drama in which Jaywant played the heroine reforming the anti-hero. She and Kumar further collaborated on films such as Jalpari (1952), Kafila (1952), Nau Bahar (1952), Saloni (1952), Lakeeren (1954), Naaz (1954), Mr. X (1957), Sheroo (1957) and Toofan Mein Pyar Kahan (1963).

Jaywant remained an important leading actress through the mid-1950s, appearing in such films as Rahi (1953), Shikast (1953), Railway Platform (1955), Nastik (1954), Munimji (1955), and Ham Sab Chor Hain (1956 film), The 1958 film Kala Pani, directed by Raj Khosla, was Jaywant's last successful movie, for which she won the Filmfare Best Supporting Actress Award. Bombay Race Course (1965) was the last film she made before retirement. After 18 years, she returned as a character actress in Nastik which marked her last film appearance.

Death 
Jaywant died on 22 December 2010, aged 84, at her bungalow of 60 years at Union Park, Chembur, Mumbai, India. Her death was not noticed by anyone until an ambulance carried her body after 3 days of her demise. Jaywant's neighbours reported that she had secluded herself from society and had not been meeting people after Dayal's death in 2001. Her relatives were also not in touch with her for long.

Filmography 
  Nastik (1983)
  Bandish (1980)
 Bombay Race Course (1965)
 Toofaan Mein Pyar Kahan (1963)
 Girls' Hostel (1962)
 Zindagi Aur Hum (1962)
 Senapati (1961)
 Amar Rahe Yeh Pyar (1961)
 Mukti (1960)
 Maa Ke Aansoo (1959)
 Kala Pani (1958)
 Milan (1958)
 Sheroo (1957)
 Mr. X (1957)
 Neelmani (1957)
 Miss Bombay (1957)
 Kitna Badal Gaya Insaan (1957)
 Rani Rupmati (1957)
 Hum Sab Chor Hain (1956)
 Durgesh Nandini (1956)
 Awaaz (1956)
 Insaaf (1956)
 Fifty Fifty (1956)
 Aan Baan (1956)
 26 January 1950 (1956)
 Railway Platform (1955)
 Munimji (1955)
 Rajkanya (1955)
 Chingari (1955)
 Nastik (1954)
 Kavi (1954)
 Baap Beti (1954)
 Naaz (1954)
 Lakirein (1954)
 Mehbooba (1954)
 Shikast (1953)
 Rahi (1953)
 Jalpari (1952)
 Saloni (1952)
 Kafila (1952)
 Naubahaar (1952)
 Do Raah (1952)
 Naujawan  (1951)
 Jadoo (1951)
 Ek Nazar (1951)
 Nandkishor (1951)
 Sangram (1950)
 Samadhi (1950)
 Muqaddar (1950)
 Aankhen (1950)
 Chakori (1949)
 Anokha Pyar (1948)
 Gunjan (1948)
 Phir Bhi Apna Hai (1946)
 Adaab Arz (1943)
 Aankh Michauli (1942)
 Nirdosh (1941)
 Bahen (1941)
 Radhika (1941)

Awards 
 1959: Filmfare Award for Best Supporting Actress  – Kaala Paani
 2005: Dadsaheb Phalke Academy Lifetime Achievement award

References

External links 

 

Actresses in Hindi cinema
Indian film actresses
1926 births
2010 deaths
Actresses from Mumbai
Filmfare Awards winners
20th-century Indian actresses